Windward Islands is the southern islands of the Lesser Antilles.

Windward Islands may also refer to:
 Windward Islands (Society Islands), the eastern islands of the Society Islands in French Polynesia
 Hawaiian Windward Islands, the main islands of Hawaii
 Barlavento Islands, literally, the Windward Islands, is the northern group of the Cape Verde archipelago

See also 
 Leeward Islands (disambiguation)